UDP-N-acetylgalactosamine diphosphorylase is an enzyme with systematic name UTP:N-acetyl-alpha-D-galactosamine-1-phosphate uridylyltransferase. This enzyme catalyses the following chemical reaction

 UTP + N-acetyl-alpha-D-galactosamine 1-phosphate  diphosphate + UDP-N-acetyl-alpha-D-galactosamine

The enzyme from plants and animals also acts on N-acetyl-alpha-D-glucosamine 1-phosphate.

References

External links 
 

EC 2.7.7